In mathematics, the Schneider–Lang theorem is a refinement by  of a theorem of  about the transcendence of values of meromorphic functions.  The theorem implies both the Hermite–Lindemann and Gelfond–Schneider theorems, and implies the transcendence of some values of elliptic functions and elliptic modular functions.

Statement 
Then there are at most 
 

Examples 

 Recall that the Weierstrass P function satisfies the differential equation
 

Proof 

Thus a high-order derivative of  takes a value of small size at one such s, "size" here referring to an algebraic property of a number.

Bombieri's theorem 
 and  generalized the result to functions of several variables. Bombieri showed that if K is an algebraic number field and f1, ..., fN are meromorphic functions of d complex variables of order at most ρ generating a field K(f1, ..., fN) of transcendence degree at least d + 1 that is closed under all partial derivatives, then the set of points where all the functions fn have values in K is contained in an algebraic hypersurface in Cd of degree at most 

 gave a simpler proof of Bombieri's theorem, with a slightly stronger bound of d(ρ1 + ... + ρd+1)[K:Q] for the degree, where the ρj are the orders of d + 1 algebraically independent functions.  The special case d = 1 gives the Schneider–Lang theorem, with a bound of (ρ1 + ρ2)[K:Q]  for the number of points.

Example
If  is a polynomial with integer coefficients then the functions  are all algebraic at a dense set of points of the hypersurface .

References 

 

 
 
 
 
 

Diophantine approximation
Transcendental numbers